Line Jensen (born 14 January 1981) is a Danish triathlete. She competed in the Women's event at the 2012 Summer Olympics.

References

External links
 
 Line Jensen at International Triathlon Union

1981 births
Living people
Danish female triathletes
Olympic triathletes of Denmark
Triathletes at the 2012 Summer Olympics
People from Silkeborg
Sportspeople from the Central Denmark Region
20th-century Danish women
21st-century Danish women